The women's synchronized 3 metre springboard competition of the diving events at the 2019 Pan American Games was held on 1 August at the Aquatics Centre in Lima, Peru.

Schedule

Results

References 

Diving at the 2019 Pan American Games